Edouard Silas (22 August 18278 February 1909) who was born in Amsterdam and died in London, was a Dutch composer and organist.

He studied in Paris with Friedrich Kalkbrenner, François Benoist and Jacques Fromental Halévy. He lived in London from 1850. Silas was organist at the Catholic Chapel of Kingston upon Thames and Professor of Harmony at the Guildhall School of Music.

He was a composer of symphonies, piano concertos, string quartets and organ works. The Symphony in A, Op. 19 was first performed in 1863 and repeated the following year at the Crystal Palace. Other orchestral works include a Piano Concerto in D minor and two other works for piano and orchestra: Fantasia (performed at the Crystal Palace in 1865) and Elegie (performed 1873). He composed a Mass for four voices and organ for which he won a Belgian competition for sacred music in 1866. The oratorio Joash was given at the Norwich Festival in 1873. There are also many solo piano pieces, the best known of which include the Gavotte in E minor, Bourree in G minor, Malvina (a romance), the Suite in A minor Op.103, and Six Duets.

Silas was a teacher of harmony at the Guildhall School of Music and wrote an unpublished Treatise on Musical Notation. He was known for his humour. In his Musical Times obituary, he was remembered as "a character" often seen at the British Museum: "the little man with remarkable features and wearing a red fez".

Notes

1827 births
1909 deaths
19th-century Dutch male musicians
20th-century Dutch male musicians
Academics of the Guildhall School of Music and Drama
Dutch classical composers
Dutch classical organists
Dutch male classical composers
Dutch Romantic composers
Male classical organists
Musicians from Amsterdam
Oratorio composers
19th-century organists